Nebojša Bastajić (born 20 August 1990) is a Serbian professional footballer who plays as a forward for Napredak.

Honours
Voždovac
 Serbian League Belgrade: 2011–12

TSC Bačka Topola
 Serbian First League: 2018–19

References

External links
 
 

Living people
1990 births
Serbian footballers
Footballers from Belgrade
Association football forwards 
FK Vojvodina players
FK Voždovac players
FK Srem Jakovo players
FK Budućnost Dobanovci players
FK Bežanija players
FK Inđija players
Serbian SuperLiga players
Serbian First League players